Club Deportivo Hernani is a Spanish football club based in Hernani, Gipuzkoa, in the autonomous community of Basque Country. Founded in 1940, it plays in División de Honor – Group 1, holding home games at Campo de Fútbol Zubipe, with a capacity of 6,000 people.

Season to season

2 seasons in Segunda División B
19 seasons in Tercera División

References

External links
 
Fútbol Regional team profile 

Football clubs in the Basque Country (autonomous community)
Association football clubs established in 1940
1940 establishments in Spain
Sport in Gipuzkoa